Blepsias is a genus of marine ray-finned fishes belonging to the family Agonidae, the poachers and related fishes. These fishes are found in the coastal northern Pacific Ocean from Japan to California.

Taxonomy
Blepsias was first proposed as a genus by the French zoologist Georges Cuvier with Trachinus cirrhosus, which had originally been described in 1814 by Peter Simon Pallas from Kamchatka, as the type species. The genus is included in the subfamily Hemitripterinae of the family Agonidae. Cuvier used a Greek name for a fish, as was his habit, for the name of the new genus.

Species
The recognized species in this genus are:
 Blepsias bilobus G. Cuvier, 1829 (crested sculpin)
 Blepsias cirrhosus (Pallas, 1814) (silverspotted sculpin)

Characteristics
Blepsias has a spiny preoperculum, a compressed head, with armoured cheeks and palatine teeth. The large pectoral fins have the lower rays separate from the fin membrane. There are fleshy flaps which hang from the snout. The compressed head separate Blepsias from Hemitripterus.

Distribution and habitat
Blepsias sculpins  are found in the North Pacific and the adjacent Arctic waters from Japan and the Sea of Okhotsk north to the Chukchi and Bering seas to central California. They are demersal fishes of shallow, even intertidal, waters where there is algae.

References

Hemitripterinae
 
Taxa named by Georges Cuvier